Arbaciella is a genus of echinoderms belonging to the family Arbaciidae.

Species:

Arbaciella elegans 
Arbaciella regularis

References

Arbacioida
Echinoidea genera